Patrick Gallagher was a footballer who played one game in the English Football League for Burslem Port Vale in September 1900.

Career
Gallagher played for Smallthorne United before joining Second Division side Burslem Port Vale in May 1900. His only game came at left-half in a 2–2 draw with Small Heath at the Athletic Ground on 1 September, before being released at the end of the season.

Career statistics
Source:

References

Year of birth missing
Year of death missing
English footballers
Association football midfielders
Port Vale F.C. players
English Football League players